Kgaogelo Chauke (born 8 January 2003) is a South African professional soccer player who plays as a midfielder for Exeter City, on loan from Southampton.

Club career
Having joined Southampton from Thatcham Town in 2017, Chauke signed his first professional contract in January 2020. On 19 January 2021, Chauke made his first professional appearance in Southampton's victory over Shrewsbury Town in the FA Cup.

On 26 July 2022, Chauke signed for EFL League One club Exeter City after impressing as a trialist on a season-long loan deal.

International career
Chauke was born in South Africa and is eligible to represent both South Africa and England internationally. He was named in the England under-18 squad for a training camp in November 2020. In February 2021, Chauke was named in a 78-man preliminary squad representing South Africa at the 2020 Tokyo Olympic games. He was, however, left out of the final squad of 22.

Career statistics

Club

References

External links

Southampton FC profile

2003 births
Living people
English people of South African descent
English footballers
Thatcham Town F.C. players
Southampton F.C. players
Exeter City F.C. players
Association football midfielders
Black British sportspeople